Megaworld Corporation is a real-estate company in the Philippines. It is listed on the Philippine Stock Exchange Composite Index.
The company develops large-scale, mixed-use, planned communities incorporating residential, commercial, educational, and leisure components. In addition, it provides other services such as project design, construction oversight, and property management. Among its landmark projects is Forbes Town Center, a 6-hectare commercial and residential district in Fort Bonifacio, Taguig, Metro Manila. Another project by Megaworld is the 45-storey Petron Megaplaza office skyscraper, which was the tallest building in the country upon its completion in 1998. Also, last May 31, 2016, Megaworld announced that they will build two more office towers, 10-storey One Republic Plaza, and six-storey Emperador House, in Davao City. The two towers will provide an additional 30,000 sqm of office spaces for lease.

History
Megaworld Properties & Holdings Inc. was founded by Andrew Tan and incorporated under Philippine law on August 24, 1989, primarily aimed at engaging in real estate development, leasing, and marketing.

In 1994, it spun off Empire East Land Holdings Inc., which focused on the middle income market. It was converted to a public company on July 15, 1994.

On August 19, 1999, the company changed its name to Megaworld Corporation in line with its conversion from a purely real estate company to a holding company, though the company's core focus continues to be on real estate.

In 2013, the company gained full acquisition of Suntrust Properties.

Andrew Tan has served as Chairman of the Board and President of the company since its incorporation in 1989.

Megaworld renewed its congressional franchise for another 25 years on June 26, 2014, one day after celebrating their silver anniversary. Under Philippine law, this real estate development company will operate with franchise from Philippine congress, an authority that limits and regulates development and operations of condominiums, hotels and shopping centers.

Properties
The Megaworld Corporation has numerous development throughout the Philippines, ranging from malls (Megaworld Lifestyle Malls), offices, townships, hotels, resorts, gaming services and residential developments. It also owns companies such as the Megaworld Lifestyle Malls (in retail developments), the Megaworld Prime RFO (targeting the upper middle income and high income markets), the Empire East Land Holdings Inc., and the Suntrust Properties Inc. (both targeting the middle-income market)

Townships
In Metro Manila: 
 Alabang West - a 62 hectare commercial and residential development in Las Piñas located near Alabang.
 Arcovia City- a 12.3-hectare (30-acre) mixued-use riverside township in Pasig. 
 Eastwood City 
 Forbes Town Center 
 McKinley Hill- a  mixed use development, inspired by Spanish and Italian Architecture, housing retail, offices, residential developments, including the famed Venice Grand Canal, Taguig and embassies from the United Arab Emirates, Qatar, United Kingdom, and South Korea.
 McKinley West- a  mixed use development in Taguig 
 Newport City - a   development located near Ninoy Aquino International Airport in Pasay. The development includes the Resorts World Manila, hotels, prime offices, and retail and entertainment spaces. 
 Uptown Bonifacio - a  development in the Bonifacio Global City, it also houses the Uptown Complex and the Alliance Global Group Headquarters. 

In Luzon:
 Capital Town - a  development in San Fernando, Pampanga, standing in a land formerly owned by the Pampanga Sugar Development Company (PASUDECO) 
 Highland City - a  development in Cainta, Rizal. 
 Maple Grove - a  mixed use development in General Trias. 
 Southwoods City - a  mixed use development in Biñan, Laguna, consisting retail, residential developments, schools, a church, a cyberpark, a medical facility, open spaces, leisure facilities including a Golf course, and a own transport hub.

In Visayas:
 Boracay Newcoast- a  mixed use leisure and residential resort development in Boracay Island. 
 Iloilo Business Park- a  development in Iloilo City. 
 The Mactan Newtown - a  development in Mactan, Cebu.
 The Upper East - a  joint- venture development in Bacolod. Standing on a former sugar-processing complex owned by the Araneta Group.

In Mindanao:
 Davao Park District - an  development in Davao City.

Offices 
 The Alliance Global Tower - in Uptown Bonifacio.
 Torre Caleido in Madrid, Spain
The Petron Megaplaza in Makati CBD
 The World Centre

Residential 
 Two Central and Three Central towers
 Manhattan Gardens - an 18-tower joint venture residential development with the Araneta Group, occupying  in the Araneta City.

Controversies

Trademark dispute with Donald Trump
In 2007, Megaworld renamed a high-rise condominium project formerly called "The Trumps" into "One Central" after American real estate magnate and future U.S President Donald Trump threatened legal action over the name, saying the name "Trump" is unmistakably associated with him.

References

External links
 

Real estate companies of the Philippines
Real estate companies established in 1989
Companies listed on the Philippine Stock Exchange
Companies based in Bonifacio Global City